The Institute for Advanced Strategic and Political Studies (IASPS) was an Israel-based think tank with an affiliated office in Washington, D.C. It was founded in 1984 by its president, Professor Robert Loewenberg.

Political stance
In the US, IASPS has connections with the neoconservative movement in American politics. The institute is notable for its Clean Break report which is considered "a kind of US-Israeli neoconservative manifesto" according to journalist Jason Vest.

References

External links
 Official website

Foreign policy and strategy think tanks in the United States
Political and economic think tanks in the United States
Foreign policy political advocacy groups in the United States
New Right organizations (United States)
Think tanks established in 1984
Israel–United States relations
United States–Middle Eastern relations
Middle Eastern studies in the United States
Jewish political organizations
Foreign relations of Israel